Sivjee Glacier is a glacier 10 nautical miles (18 km) long which drains the northeast slopes of Hunt Mountain in the Churchill Mountains. It flows north along the west side of Stark Ridge to enter Starshot Glacier south of Mount Hoskins. Named by Advisory Committee on Antarctic Names (US-ACAN) after Gulamabas G. Sivjee, United States Antarctic Program (USAP) principal investigator for spectroscopic and interferometric studies of airglow and auroral processes in the upper atmosphere above the geographic South Pole, 1991–2001.

References

Glaciers of Oates Land